Alexandria Technical and Community College is a public community college in Alexandria, Minnesota. It is part of the Minnesota State Colleges and Universities (Minnesota State) system. Approximately 3,500 students are enrolled, with about 45% of those students being enrolled full-time.

Academics
Alexandria Technical and Community College offers over 50 degree programs, ranging from certificates to Associate of Science and Associate of Applied Science degrees. Several Associate of Arts degrees and transfer pathways are also offered.

Athletics
The college athletic teams known as the Legends compete in the Minnesota College Athletic Conference and are members of the National Junior College Athletic Association.

Alumni
Janice Ettle, winner of many running races, including the 1985 Twin Cities Marathon.

References

1961 establishments in Minnesota
Community colleges in Minnesota
Education in Douglas County, Minnesota
Educational institutions established in 1961
Two-year colleges in the United States